Emamiyeh may refer to various places in Iran:
 Emamiyeh, Golestan
 Emamiyeh, Anar, Kerman Province
 Emamiyeh, Fahraj, Kerman Province
 Emamiyeh 1, Fahraj County, Kerman Province
 Emamiyeh, Kermanshah
 Emamiyeh-e Olya, Kermanshah Province
 Emamiyeh-e Sofla, Kermanshah Province
 Emamiyeh, Mazandaran
 Emamiyeh, Razavi Khorasan
 Emamiyeh, Sistan and Baluchestan